The 2012 Indianapolis motorcycle Grand Prix (formally the 2012 Red Bull Indianapolis Grand Prix) was the eleventh round of the 2012 Grand Prix motorcycle racing season. It was held on 19 August 2012 at the Indianapolis Motor Speedway in Indianapolis, Indiana.

After being absent from the United States Grand Prix at Laguna Seca, the Moto2 and Moto3 classes returned to competition at Indianapolis.

Classification

MotoGP

Moto2

Moto3

Championship standings after the race (MotoGP)
Below are the standings for the top five riders and constructors after round eleven has concluded.

Riders' Championship standings

Constructors' Championship standings

 Note: Only the top five positions are included for both sets of standings.

References

Indianapolis motorcycle Grand Prix
Indianapolis
Indianapolis motorcycle Grand Prix
Indianapolis motorcycle Grand Prix
Indianapolis motorcycle Grand Prix